Ellen Allgurin (born 10 May 1994 in Värnamo) is a Swedish tennis player.

Allgurin has won two singles and two doubles titles on the ITF tour in her career. On 4 May 2015, she reached her best singles ranking of world number 362. On 12 August 2013, she peaked at world number 588 in the doubles rankings.

Allgurin has a win–loss record of 4–3 for the Sweden Fed Cup team.

ITF finals (4–5)

Singles (2–5)

Doubles (2–0)

External links 

 
 
 

1994 births
Living people
People from Värnamo Municipality
Swedish female tennis players
Sportspeople from Jönköping County
20th-century Swedish women
21st-century Swedish women